Marshall High School is a historic high school building located at Marshall, Madison County, North Carolina.  It was designed by noted Raleigh architect Frank B. Simpson and built in 1926.  It is two-story-plus-basement, "U"-shaped brick building with a low hip roof in the Colonial Revival style.  Marshall High School continued to serve the community until a new high school was built in 1973.  The building was damaged in a flood in 2004, and was subsequently renovated starting in February 2007.

It was listed on the National Register of Historic Places in 2008.

References

High schools in North Carolina
School buildings on the National Register of Historic Places in North Carolina
Colonial Revival architecture in North Carolina
School buildings completed in 1926
Buildings and structures in Madison County, North Carolina
National Register of Historic Places in Madison County, North Carolina
1926 establishments in North Carolina